The 2015–16 San Miguel Beermen season was the 41st season of the franchise in the Philippine Basketball Association (PBA).

Key dates 
 August 23: The 2015 PBA draft took place at Midtown Atrium, Robinson Place Manila.

Draft picks

Roster

Philippine Cup

Transactions

Trades

Activation

Eliminations

Standings

Game log 

|- style="background:#bfb;"
| 1
| October 24
| GlobalPort
| W 97–86
| June Mar Fajardo (21)
| June Mar Fajardo (17)
| Alex Cabagnot (8)
| University of Southeastern Philippines Gym
| 1–0
|- style="background:#bfb;"
| 2
| October 28
| Meralco
| W 101–85
| Alex Cabagnot (18)
| June Mar Fajardo (12)
| Marcio Lassiter (5)
| Smart Araneta Coliseum
| 2–0

|- style="background:#fbb;"
| 3
| November 4
| Rain or Shine
| L 84–99
| Alex Cabagnot (16)
| June Mar Fajardo (10)
| Alex Cabagnot (4)
| Mall of Asia Arena
| 2–1
|- style="background:#bfb;"
| 4
| November 11
| Blackwater
| W 93–83
| Fajardo, Lassiter (20)
| June Mar Fajardo (13)
| Marcio Lassiter (5)
| Philsports Arena
| 3–1
|- style="background:#bfb;"
| 5
| November 15
| Ginebra
| W 100–82
| Arwind Santos (24)
| June Mar Fajardo (14)
| Chris Ross (8)
| Philsports Arena
| 4–1
|- style="background:#bfb;"
| 6
| November 22
| Barako Bull
| W 106–105
| June Mar Fajardo (28)
| June Mar Fajardo (20)
| Alex Cabagnot (8)
| Ynares Center
| 5–1
|- style="background:#bfb;"
| 7
| November 28
| Star
| W 101–90
| June Mar Fajardo (27)
| June Mar Fajardo (16)
| Alex Cabagnot (5)
| Mall of Asia Arena
| 6–1

|- style="background:#bfb;"
| 8
| December 2
| Mahindra
| W 102–86
| June Mar Fajardo (35)
| June Mar Fajardo (12)
| Brian Heruela (5)
| Smart Araneta Coliseum
| 7–1
|- style="background:#bfb;"
| 9
| December 9
| NLEX
| W 88–80 (OT)
| Cabagnot, de Ocampo (17)
| Yancy de Ocampo (12)
| Heruela, Ross (4)
| Cuneta Astrodome
| 8–1
|- style="background:#bfb;"
| 10
| December 12
| TNT
| W 97–84
| Arwind Santos (30)
| June Mar Fajardo (15)
| Alex Cabagnot (6)
| Smart Araneta Coliseum
| 9–1
|- style="background:#fbb;"
| 11
| December 16
| Alaska
| L 97–103
| June Mar Fajardo (43)
| June Mar Fajardo (20)
| Cabagnot, Lutz (5)
| Smart Araneta Coliseum
| 9–2

Playoffs

Bracket

Game log 

|- style="background:#bfb;"
| 1
| January 5
| Rain or Shine
| W 109–105
| June Mar Fajardo (36)
| June Mar Fajardo (18)
| Arwind Santos (5)
| Mall of Asia Arena
| 1–0
|- style="background:#fbb;"
| 2
| January 7
| Rain or Shine
| L 97–105
| June Mar Fajardo (38)
| June Mar Fajardo (17)
| Marcio Lassiter (4)
| Smart Araneta Coliseum
| 1–1
|- style="background:#fbb;"
| 3
| January 9
| Rain or Shine
| L 106–111
| June Mar Fajardo (40)
| June Mar Fajardo (20)
| Alex Cabagnot (6)
| Smart Araneta Coliseum
| 1–2
|- style="background:#bfb;"
| 4
| January 11
| Rain or Shine
| W 105–92
| June Mar Fajardo (33)
| June Mar Fajardo (15)
| Fajardo, Lassiter, Ross (3)
| Smart Araneta Coliseum
| 2–2
|- style="background:#bfb;"
| 5
| January 13
| Rain or Shine
| W 103–94
| June Mar Fajardo (27)
| June Mar Fajardo (12)
| Alex Cabagnot (6)
| Smart Araneta Coliseum
| 3–2
|- style="background:#bfb;"
| 6
| January 15
| Rain or Shine
| W 90–82
| Marcio Lassiter (22)
| Arwind Santos (19)
| Chris Ross (6)
| Smart Araneta Coliseum
| 4–2

|- style="background:#fbb;"
| 1
| January 17
| Alaska
| L 91–100
| Alex Cabagnot (20)
| Gabby Espinas (8)
| Cabagnot, Ross (4)
| Smart Araneta Coliseum
| 0–1
|- style="background:#fbb;"
| 2
| January 19
| Alaska
| L 80–83
| Alex Cabagnot (23)
| Yancy de Ocampo (14)
| Marcio Lassiter (3)
| Smart Araneta Coliseum
| 0–2
|- style="background:#fbb;"
| 3
| January 22
| Alaska
| L 75–82
| Jay-R Reyes (13)
| Arwind Santos (9)
| Alex Cabagnot (5)
| Quezon Convention Center
| 0–3
|- style="background:#bfb;"
| 4
| January 24
| Alaska
| W 110–104 (OT)
| Marcio Lassiter (26)
| Gabby Espinas (14)
| Chris Ross (9)
| PhilSports Arena
| 1–3
|- style="background:#bfb;"
| 5
| January 27
| Alaska
| W 86–73 (OT)
| Arwind Santos (22)
| Arwind Santos (16)
| Chris Ross (7)
| Smart Araneta Coliseum
| 2–3
|- style="background:#bfb;"
| 6
| January 29
| Alaska
| W 100–89
| Marcio Lassiter (26)
| Arwind Santos (15)
| de Ocampo, Lutz, Ross (3)
| Smart Araneta Coliseum12,626
| 3–3
|- style="background:#bfb;"
| 7
| February 3
| Alaska
| W 96–89
| Fajardo, Ross (21)
| June Mar Fajardo (15)
| Cabagnot, Ross (5)
| Mall of Asia Arena23,616
| 4–3

Commissioner's Cup

Transactions

Signings

Local player

Import

Activation

Free Agency

Eliminations

Standings

Game log 

|- style="background:#fbb"
| 1
| February 20
| Mahindra
| L 96–102
| Tyler Wilkerson (29)
| Tyler Wilkerson (12)
| Chris Ross (6)
| Alonte Sports Arena
| 0–1
|- style="background:#bfb"
| 2
| February 26
| GlobalPort
| W 120–109
| Tyler Wilkerson (52)
| Tyler Wilkerson (11)
| Chris Ross (9)
| Smart Araneta Coliseum
| 1–1

|- style="background:#bfb;"
| 3
| March 2
| Blackwater
| W 108–96
| Tyler Wilkerson (35)
| Tyler Wilkerson (17)
| Lassiter, Santos (3)
| Ynares Center
| 2–1
|- style="background:#bfb;"
| 4
| March 5
| Meralco
| W 94–86
| Tyler Wilkerson (27)
| June Mar Fajardo (16)
| Alex Cabagnot (4)
| Ibalong Centrum for Recreation
| 3–1
|- style="background:#fbb;"
| 5
| March 11
| Rain or Shine
| L 105–108
| Tyler Wilkerson (33)
| Tyler Wilkerson (10)
| Chris Ross (5)
| Smart Araneta Coliseum
| 3–2
|- style="background:#bfb;"
| 6
| March 16
| Alaska
| W 116–96
| Tyler Wilkerson (32)
| Tyler Wilkerson (14)
| Chris Ross (12)
| Smart Araneta Coliseum
| 4–2
|- style="background:#bfb;"
| 7
| March 27
| Star
| W 117–98
| Tyler Wilkerson (44)
| Tyler Wilkerson (17)
| Chris Ross (10)
| Smart Araneta Coliseum
| 5–2

|- style="background:#fbb;"
| 8
| April 3
| Ginebra
| L 84–110
| Tyler Wilkerson (20)
| Tyler Wilkerson (16)
| Chris Ross (5)
| Smart Araneta Coliseum
| 5–3
|- style="background:#bfb;"
| 9
| April 5
| NLEX
| W 131–127 (3OT)
| Tyler Wilkerson (58)
| June Mar Fajardo (16)
| Alex Cabagnot (12)
| Smart Araneta Coliseum
| 6–3
|- style="background:#bfb;"
| 10
| April 10
| Phoenix
| W 121–109
| Tyler Wilkerson (40)
| Tyler Wilkerson (19)
| Chris Ross (12)
| Smart Araneta Coliseum
| 7–3
|- style="background:#bfb;"
| 11
| April 15
| TNT
| W 104–98
| Tyler Wilkerson (36)
| Tyler Wilkerson (15)
| Chris Ross (8)
| Smart Araneta Coliseum
| 8–3

Playoffs

Bracket

Game log 

|- style="background:#fbb;"
| 1
| April 18
| Star
| L 99–108
| June Mar Fajardo (24)
| Tyler Wilkerson (14)
| Alex Cabagnot (5)
| Smart Araneta Coliseum
| 0–1
|- style="background:#bfb;"
| 2
| April 20
| Star
| W 103–99
| Tyler Wilkerson (46)
| Tyler Wilkerson (17)
| Chris Ross (5)
| Smart Araneta Coliseum
| 1–1

|- style="background:#fbb;"
| 1
| April 24
| Rain or Shine
| L 94–98
| Tyler Wilkerson (40)
| June Mar Fajardo (13)
| Arwind Santos (4)
| Smart Araneta Coliseum
| 0–1
|- style="background:#fbb;"
| 2
| April 26
| Rain or Shine
| L 96–98
| Tyler Wilkerson (35)
| Tyler Wilkerson (18)
| Chris Ross (7)
| Smart Araneta Coliseum
| 0–2
|- style="background:#bfb;"
| 3
| April 28
| Rain or Shine
| W 104–98
| Marcio Lassiter (30)
| June Mar Fajardo (9)
| Chris Ross (12)
| PhilSports Arena
| 1–2
|- style="background:#fbb;"
| 4
| May 1
| Rain or Shine
| L 99–124
| Arizona Reid (25)
| Arizona Reid (17)
| Alex Cabagnot (8)
| Smart Araneta Coliseum
| 1–3

Governors' Cup

Transactions

Signings

Import

Eliminations

Standings

Game log 

|- style="background:#bfb"
| 1
| July 17
| Phoenix
| W 124–113
| Arizona Reid (41)
| June Mar Fajardo (11)
| Marcio Lassiter (6)
| Smart Araneta Coliseum
| 1–0
|- style="background:#bfb"
| 2
| July 22
| NLEX
| W 94–93
| Arizona Reid (23)
| Arizona Reid (11)
| Chris Ross (6)
| Smart Araneta Coliseum
| 2–0
|- style="background:#fbb"
| 3
| July 27
| Mahindra
| L 103–105
| Arizona Reid (43)
| Arizona Reid (11)
| Alex Cabagnot (5)
| Smart Araneta Coliseum
| 2–1
|- style="background:#bfb"
| 4
| July 31
| Star
| W 109–100
| Arizona Reid (34)
| June Mar Fajardo (13)
| Arizona Reid (11)
| Smart Araneta Coliseum
| 3–1

|- style="background:#bfb"
| 5
| August 14
| Ginebra
| W 111–105 (2OT)
| Arizona Reid (26)
| June Mar Fajardo (17)
| Reid, Ross (5)
| Mall of Asia Arena12,423
| 4–1
|- style="background:#fbb"
| 6
| August 19
| GlobalPort
| L 92–98
| Arizona Reid (41)
| Arizona Reid (15)
| Marcio Lassiter (5)
| Ynares Center
| 4–2
|- style="background:#bfb"
| 7
| August 24
| Alaska
| W 106–103
| June Mar Fajardo (37)
| June Mar Fajardo (14)
| Chris Ross (9)
| Smart Araneta Coliseum
| 5–2
|- style="background:#bfb"
| 8
| August 31
| Meralco
| W 110–106
| June Mar Fajardo (24)
| Mike Singletary (20)
| Chris Ross (6)
| Smart Araneta Coliseum
| 6–2

|- style="background:#fbb"
| 9
| September 3
| TNT
| L 85–105
| June Mar Fajardo (20)
| June Mar Fajardo (13)
| Marcio Lassiter (4)
| Batangas City Coliseum
| 6–3
|- style="background:#bfb"
| 10
| September 10
| Rain or Shine
| W 82–75
| Mike Singletary (23)
| Fajardo, Singletary (12)
| Mike Singletary (4)
| Mall of Asia Arena
| 7–3
|- style="background:#bfb"
| 11
| September 18
| Blackwater
| W 107–101
| Elijah Millsap (25)
| Elijah Millsap (14)
| Chris Ross (6)
| Alonte Sports Arena
| 8–3

Playoffs

Bracket

Game log 

|- style="background:#bfb"
| 1
| September 22
| NLEX
| W 114–110
| Elijah Millsap (39)
| June Mar Fajardo (13)
| June Mar Fajardo (5)
| Smart Araneta Coliseum
| 1–0

|- style="background:#fbb"
| 1
| September 26
| Ginebra
| L 108–115
| Elijah Millsap (29)
| June Mar Fajardo (15)
| Elijah Millsap (11)
| Smart Araneta Coliseum
| 0–1
|- style="background:#bfb"
| 2
| September 28
| Ginebra
| W 95–92
| Elijah Millsap (25)
| June Mar Fajardo (23)
| Alex Cabagnot (8)
| Smart Araneta Coliseum
| 1–1
|- style="background:#fbb"
| 3
| September 30
| Ginebra
| L 96–97
| Elijah Millsap (24)
| Fajardo, Millsap (12)
| Alex Cabagnot (6)
| Smart Araneta Coliseum
| 1–2
|- style="background:#bfb"
| 4
| October 2
| Ginebra
| W 101–72
| Marcio Lassiter (25)
| Elijah Millsap (17)
| Chris Ross (5)
| Smart Araneta Coliseum22,196
| 2–2
|- style="background:#fbb"
| 5
| October 4
| Ginebra
| L 92–117
| Arwind Santos (24)
| June Mar Fajardo (12)
| Alex Cabagnot (6)
| Smart Araneta Coliseum20,374
| 2–3

Statistics

Philippine Cup 

|- align="center" bgcolor="#f0f0f0"
|  || 17 || 0 || 8.5 || 14 || 45 || .311 || 3 || 12 || .250 || 7 || 12 || .583 || 1.28 || 1.17 || 0.67 || 0.00 || 0.72 || 2.11
|- align="center" bgcolor=""
|  || style="background:#CE2029;color:#FFFFFF;"|24 || 15 || 18.8 || 51 || 97 || .526 || 4 || 13 || .308 || 5 || 12 || .417 || 1.88 || 1.46 || 0.21 || 0.00 || 0.96 || 4.62
|- align="center" bgcolor="#f0f0f0"
|  || 19 || 1 || 7.5 || 16 || 43 || .372 || 2 || 5 || .400 || 12 || 20 || .600 || 2.26 || 0.16 || 0.16 || 0.26 || 0.63 || 2.42
|- align="center" bgcolor=""
|  || style="background:#CE2029;color:#FFFFFF;"|24 || 22 || 31.8 || 115 || 301 || .382 || 37 || 129 || .287 || 63 || 86 || .733 || 3.42 || style="background:#CE2029;color:#FFFFFF;"|4.04 || 1.12 || 0.08 || 1.50 || 13.75
|- align="center" bgcolor="#f0f0f0"
|  || style="background:#CE2029;color:#FFFFFF;"|24 || 8 || 24.3 || 50 || 146 || .342 || 12 || 51 || .235 || 34 || 46 || .739 || 3.29 || 3.88 || style="background:#CE2029;color:#FFFFFF;"|1.67 || 0.38 || 1.92 || 6.08
|- align="center" bgcolor=""
|  || 22 || 10 || 30.6 || 101 || 246 || .411 || 46 || 121 || .380 || 50 || 60 || style="background:#CE2029;color:#FFFFFF;"|.833 || 4.45 || 2.05 || 1.00 || 0.50 || 2.32 || 13.55
|- align="center" bgcolor="#f0f0f0"
|  || 20 || 17 || 34.8 || style="background:#CE2029;color:#FFFFFF;"|185 || 319 || style="background:#CE2029;color:#FFFFFF;"|.580 || 0 || 2 || .000 || style="background:#CE2029;color:#FFFFFF;"|122 || style="background:#CE2029;color:#FFFFFF;"|183 || .667 || style="background:#CE2029;color:#FFFFFF;"|13.90 || 1.50 || 0.60 || style="background:#CE2029;color:#FFFFFF;"|1.90 || 3.95 || style="background:#CE2029;color:#FFFFFF;"|24.60
|- align="center" bgcolor=""
|  || 23 || 2 || 11.8 || 26 || 72 || .361 || 4 || 16 || .250 || 5 || 11 || .455 || 2.39 || 1.04 || 0.17 || 0.04 || 1.09 || 2.65
|- align="center" bgcolor="#f0f0f0"
|  || 7 || 0 || 5.29 || 4 || 10 || .400 || 0 || 0 || .000 || 0 || 1 || .000 || 0.71 || 0.00 || 0.14 || 0.00 || 0.71 || 1.14
|- align="center" bgcolor=""
|  || 23 || 2 || 15.8 || 58 || 110 || .527 || 3 || 6 || style="background:#CE2029;color:#FFFFFF;"|.500 || 38 || 60 || .633 || 4.35 || 0.43 || 0.22 || 0.35 || 1.30 || 6.83
|- align="center" bgcolor="#f0f0f0"
|  || 2 || 0 || 2.3 || 0 || 2 || .000 || 0 || 0 || .000 || 1 || 2 || .500 || 1.00 || 0.00 || 0.00 || 0.00 || 1.00 || 0.50
|- align="center" bgcolor=""
|  || style="background:#CE2029;color:#FFFFFF;"|24 || style="background:#CE2029;color:#FFFFFF;"|24 || style="background:#CE2029;color:#FFFFFF;"|35.6 || 126 || style="background:#CE2029;color:#FFFFFF;"|356 || .354 || style="background:#CE2029;color:#FFFFFF;"|49 || style="background:#CE2029;color:#FFFFFF;"|183 || .268 || 35 || 43 || .814 || 9.42 || 2.08 || 1.08 || 1.83 || 2.29 || 14.00
|- align="center" bgcolor="#f0f0f0"
|  || 2 || 0 || 2.50 || 0 || 0 || .000 || 0 || 0 || .000 || 0 || 0 || .000 || 0.00 || 0.00 || 0.00 || 0.00 || style="background:#CE2029;color:#FFFFFF;"|0.50 || 0.00
|- align="center" bgcolor=""
|  || style="background:#CE2029;color:#FFFFFF;"|24 || 15 || 23.9 || 65 || 174 || .374 || 29 || 102 || .284 || 34 || 44 || .773 || 3.92 || 0.75 || 0.33 || 0.12 || 1.12 || 8.04
|- align="center" bgcolor="#f0f0f0"
|  || 20 || 4 || 12.5 || 32 || 73 || .438 || 8 || 19 || .421 || 25 || 30 || style="background:#CE2029;color:#FFFFFF;"|.833 || 4.10 || 0.95 || 0.10 || 0.35 || 1.00 || 4.85
|}

Commissioner's Cup 

|- align="center" bgcolor="#f0f0f0"
|  || 9 || 0 || 6.4 || 5 || 17 || .294 || 1 || 8 || .125 || 2 || 2 || style="background:#CE2029;color:#FFFFFF;"|1.000 || 0.89 || 1.00 || 0.33 || 0.00 || 0.67 || 1.44
|- align="center" bgcolor=""
|  || 11 || 1 || 9.6 || 5 || 19 || .263 || 0 || 0 || .000 || 2 || 3 || .667 || 0.45 || 0.82 || 0.09 || 0.09 || 0.64 || 1.09
|- align="center" bgcolor="#f0f0f0"
|  || 9 || 3 || 8.7 || 5 || 18 || .278 || 0 || 3 || .000 || 2 || 4 || .500 || 2.11 || 0.56 || 0.11 || 0.11 || 0.67 || 1.33
|- align="center" bgcolor=""
|  || 16 || 9 || 31.4 || 77 || 187 || .412 || 33 || 94 || .351 || 34 || 46 || .739 || 3.88 || 3.94 || 0.56 || 0.19 || 1.94 || 13.81
|- align="center" bgcolor="#f0f0f0"
|  || style="background:#CE2029;color:#FFFFFF;"|17 || 11 || 30.6 || 47 || 108 || .435 || 7 || 34 || .206 || 45 || 60 || .750 || 4.12 || style="background:#CE2029;color:#FFFFFF;"|6.35 || style="background:#CE2029;color:#FFFFFF;"|2.29 || 0.18 || 2.24 || 8.59
|- align="center" bgcolor=""
|  || style="background:#CE2029;color:#FFFFFF;"|17 || style="background:#CE2029;color:#FFFFFF;"|16 || 36.1 || 84 || 205 || .410 || style="background:#CE2029;color:#FFFFFF;"|56 || 132 || .424 || 27 || 36 || .750 || 4.12 || 2.82 || 1.12 || 0.29 || 1.88 || 14.76
|- align="center" bgcolor="#f0f0f0"
|  || 15 || 11 || 30.4 || 82 || 149 || .550 || 0 || 0 || .000 || 49 || 79 || .620 || 9.20 || 0.87 || 0.33 || 0.73 || 2.13 || 14.20
|- align="center" bgcolor=""
|  || 13 || 1 || 10.0 || 12 || 26 || .462 || 3 || 6 || .500 || 4 || 6 || .667 || 0.92 || 0.38 || 0.38 || 0.08 || 0.62 || 2.38
|- align="center" bgcolor="#f0f0f0"
|  || 6 || 0 || 9.2 || 9 || 17 || .529 || 5 || 8 || style="background:#CE2029;color:#FFFFFF;"|.625 || 0 || 0 || .000 || 0.83 || 0.17 || 0.00 || 0.00 || 0.83 || 3.83
|- align="center" bgcolor=
|  || 1 || 0 || 6.0 || 0 || 0 || .000 || 0 || 0 || .000 || 0 || 0 || .000 || 1.00 || 0.00 || 0.00 || 0.00 || style="background:#CE2029;color:#FFFFFF;"|0.00 || 0.00
|- align="center" bgcolor="#f0f0f0"
|  || 16 || 1 || 14.8 || 30 || 53 || style="background:#CE2029;color:#FFFFFF;"|.566 || 1 || 3 || .333 || 20 || 24 || .833 || 3.12 || 0.44 || 0.12 || 0.12 || 0.38 || 5.06
|- align="center" bgcolor=""
|  ||| 3 || 0 || 1.0 || 2 || 4 || .500 || 0 || 0 || .000 || 0 || 0 || .000 || 0.00 || 0.00 || 0.00 || 0.00 || 0.33 || 1.33
|- align="center" bgcolor="#f0f0f0"
|  || 15 || 3 || 27.3 || 56 || 148 || .378 || 31 || 106 || .292 || 15 || 23 || .652 || 4.60 || 1.20 || 0.13 || 1.13 || 1.00 || 10.53
|- align="center" bgcolor=""
|  || 1 || 1 || 38.0 || 12 || 31 || .387 || 0 || 6 || .000 || 1 || 2 || .500 || style="background:#CE2029;color:#FFFFFF;"|17.00 || 5.00 || 1.00 || 0.00 || 5.00 || 25.00
|- align="center" bgcolor="#f0f0f0"
|  || 15 || 15 || style="background:#CE2029;color:#FFFFFF;"|43.1 || style="background:#CE2029;color:#FFFFFF;"|187 || style="background:#CE2029;color:#FFFFFF;"|388 || .482 || 48 || style="background:#CE2029;color:#FFFFFF;"|136 || .353 || style="background:#CE2029;color:#FFFFFF;"|127 || style="background:#CE2029;color:#FFFFFF;"|168 || .756 || 14.27 || 2.67 || 1.40 || style="background:#CE2029;color:#FFFFFF;"|2.07 || 4.33 || style="background:#CE2029;color:#FFFFFF;"|36.60
|- align="center" bgcolor=""
|  || 10 || 8 || 9.6 || 6 || 18 || .333 || 0 || 0 || .000 || 2 || 4 || .500 || 1.70 || 0.20 || 0.10 || 0.00 || 0.20 || 1.40
|- align="center" bgcolor="#f0f0f0"
|  || 11 || 3 || 9.0 || 6 || 26 || .231 || 4 || 16 || .250 || 6 || 8 || .750 || 1.27 || 0.45 || 0.36 || 0.00 || 0.45 || 2.00
|- align="center" bgcolor=""
|  || 11 || 0 || 9.6 || 5 || 24 || .208 || 1 || 10 || .100 || 5 || 8 || .625 || 2.09 || 0.36 || 0.09 || 0.27 || 0.27 || 1.45
|}
*Stats after being acquired by the Beermen in an in-season transaction.

Governors' Cup 

|- align="center" bgcolor="#f0f0f0"
|  || 3 || 0 || 13.7 || 4 || 17 || .235 || 3 || 10 || .300 || 0 || 2 || .000 || 1.67 || 2.33 || 0.67 || 0.00 || 1.00 || 3.67
|- align="center" bgcolor=""
|  || 10 || 0 || 6.7 || 9 || 21 || .429 || 5 || 10 || .500 || 1 || 2 || .500 || 1.00 || 0.70 || 0.10 || 0.10 || 0.40 || 2.40
|- align="center" bgcolor="#f0f0f0"
|  || 0 || 0 || 0.0 || 0 || 0 || .000 || 0 || 0 || .000 || 0 || 0 || .000 || 0.00 || 0.00 || 0.00 || 0.00 || 0.00 || 0.00
|- align="center" bgcolor=""
|  || 11 || 3 || 6.5 || 10 || 17 || .588 || 3 || 5 || .600 || 2 || 6 || .333 || 1.36 || 0.09 || 0.00 || 0.09 || 0.09 || 2.27
|- align="center" bgcolor="#f0f0f0"
|  || 16 || style="background:#CE2029;color:#FFFFFF;"|15 || 34.9 || 86 || 200 || .430 || 34 || 81 || .420 || 43 || 56 || .768 || 3.69 || 3.81 || 1.06 || 0.12 || 2.06 || 15.56
|- align="center" bgcolor=""
|  || 16 || 7 || 24.1 || 32 || 84 || .381 || 3 || 22 || .136 || 12 || 19 || .632 || 3.44 || 4.44 || style="background:#CE2029;color:#FFFFFF;"|2.00 || 0.25 || 2.31 || 4.94
|- align="center" bgcolor="#f0f0f0"
|  || 7 || 7 || 38.1 || 59 || 159 || .371 || 23 || 65 || .354 || 32 || 50 || .640 || 11.71 || style="background:#CE2029;color:#FFFFFF;"|4.57 || 1.43 || 0.86 || 3.86 || 24.71
|- align="center" bgcolor=""
|  || 3 || 3 || 39.3 || 21 || 54 || .389 || 2 || 14 || .143 || 18 || 31 || .581 || style="background:#CE2029;color:#FFFFFF;"|13.00 || 3.67 || 1.00 || 1.00 || 3.67 || 20.67
|- align="center" bgcolor="#f0f0f0"
|  || style="background:#CE2029;color:#FFFFFF;"|17 || 14 || 34.5 || 66 || 154 || .429 || style="background:#CE2029;color:#FFFFFF;"|43 || style="background:#CE2029;color:#FFFFFF;"|100 || .430 || 8 || 11 || .727 || 4.06 || 2.88 || 0.88 || 0.65 || 2.00 || 10.76
|- align="center" bgcolor=""
|  || style="background:#CE2029;color:#FFFFFF;"|17 || 14 || 35.7 || style="background:#CE2029;color:#FFFFFF;"|117 || style="background:#CE2029;color:#FFFFFF;"|201 || .582 || 0 || 1 || .000 || style="background:#CE2029;color:#FFFFFF;"|87 || style="background:#CE2029;color:#FFFFFF;"|130 || .669 || 12.88 || 1.47 || 0.41 || 1.35 || 3.24 || 18.88
|- align="center" bgcolor="#f0f0f0"
|  || 12 || 0 || 9.0 || 10 || 27 || .370 || 5 || 10 || .500 || 3 || 7 || .427 || 1.17 || 0.17 || 0.17 || 0.08 || 0.67 || 2.33
|- align="center" bgcolor=""
|  || 11 || 1 || 11.6 || 20 || 49 || .408 || 7 || 24 || .292 || 6 || 10 || .600 || 1.27 || 0.18 || 0.00 || 0.09 || 0.45 || 4.82
|- align="center" bgcolor="#f0f0f0"
|  || 8 || 0 || 7.5 || 6 || 11 || .545 || 1 || 1 || style="background:#CE2029;color:#FFFFFF;"|1.000 || 4 || 6 || .667 || 1.25 || 0.38 || 0.38 || 0.00 || 0.62 || 2.12
|- align="center" bgcolor=""
|  ||| 2 || 0 || 1.5 || 1 || 1 || style="background:#CE2029;color:#FFFFFF;"|1.000 || 0 || 0 || .000 || 0 || 0 || .000 || 0.00 || 0.00 || 0.00 || 0.00 || 0.00 || 1.00
|- align="center" bgcolor="#f0f0f0"
|  || 13 || 11 || 32.1 || 63 || 147 || .429 || 27 || 84 || .321 || 24 || 26 || style="background:#CE2029;color:#FFFFFF;"|.923 || 6.92 || 2.08 || 0.69 || style="background:#CE2029;color:#FFFFFF;"|1.46 || 1.23 || 13.62
|- align="center" bgcolor=""
|  || 6 || 6 || style="background:#CE2029;color:#FFFFFF;"|43.5 || 80 || 171 || .468 || 17 || 57 || .298 || 31 || 34 || .912 || 11.17 || 4.50 || 1.67 || 0.33 || 3.50 || style="background:#CE2029;color:#FFFFFF;"|34.67
|- align="center" bgcolor="#f0f0f0"
|  || 8 || 0 || 5.3 || 1 || 3 || .333 || 0 || 0 || .000 || 0 || 2 || .000 || 1.62 || 0.12 || 0.12 || 0.00 || 0.25 || 0.25
|- align="center" bgcolor=""
|  || style="background:#CE2029;color:#FFFFFF;"|17 || 3 || 16.4 || 27 || 86 || .314 || 21 || 59 || .356 || 9 || 11 || .818 || 2.82 || 0.53 || 0.29 || 0.12 || 0.65 || 4.94
|- align="center" bgcolor="#f0f0f0"
|  || 13 || 0 || 10.2 || 13 || 32 || .406 || 3 || 13 || .231 || 0 || 1 || .000 || 2.77 || 0.62 || 0.15 || 0.31 || 0.77 || 2.23
|}

References 

San Miguel Beermen seasons
San Miguel